Bluett is a surname. Notable people with the surname include:

Fred Bluett (1876–1942), London-born Australian vaudevillian 
Grant Bluett, Australian orienteer
Gus Bluett (1902–1936), son of Fred, Australian comic actor
John Bluett (1603–1634), English politician
John Bluett (cricketer) (1930–2019), English cricketer
Lennie Bluett (1919–2016), American film actor, pianist, dancer and singer
Thomas Bluett (c. 1690–1749), Maryland colonial judge and writer  
Thomas Bluett (politician) (1879–1958), Pennsylvania politician  
William Bluett (1834–1885), New Zealand politician

See also
Blewett, a surname
Blewit, two species of edible mushrooms
Blewitt, a surname
Bluet (disambiguation)
Bluett Wallop (1726–1749), British soldier, courtier and politician
Bluiett, a surname

References